Athlit is an album by ambient musician Oöphoi. It was released in 2002 on Hypnos Recordings.

Track listing
"Drifting into Black Space" - 16:40
"An Ever-Changing Horizon" - 10:30
"On Wings Of Light" - 18:05
"Lord Of The Starfields" - 28:31

References

Oöphoi albums
2008 albums